Volta Hotels Limited is Strategic Business Unit instituted by the Volta River Authority (VRA), in Ghana.

The organization oversees the management of all of VRA's recreational and non-power generation ventures on the Volta River.
They include:
Dodi Princess - a cruise ship on Lake Volta reservoir.
Akosombo Hotel - a hotel at Akosombo, Ghana.

References

Service companies of Ghana
Volta River Authority